Steven St. Croix (born Ben Banks; February 24, 1968) is an American pornographic actor and director. In 2013, he received a NightMoves Lifetime Achievement Award. St. Croix has made several mainstream appearances, including a music video for Gloria Estefan and the 2004 film The Girl Next Door.

Early life
St. Croix was born in Connecticut. Raised as a Jehovah's Witness, he grew up in a "very religious, strict" household. At 18, he had his first sexual experience. St. Croix attended vocational school to become a mason. He also worked in telemarketing and adult video sales prior to his porn career.

Career

St. Croix entered the adult film industry as a production assistant in December 1992. While working on the film Deep Throat 6, he performed in his first scene after an actor failed to show up. In 1995, St. Croix became the first male performer to sign an exclusive contract with Los Angeles-based studio Vivid Entertainment.

St. Croix first left the industry in the late 1990s to pursue mainstream acting. During this time, he took classes under an acting coach and learned improv from the comedy troupe Groundlings. He also body doubled for Brian Bosworth, was an extra on Baywatch, and danced in music videos for Gloria Estefan and Jon Secada. After struggling to pay his bills, he returned to acting in pornographic films.

In 2005, he was inducted into the AVN Hall of Fame. St. Croix left the adult film industry again in late 2010, only to return in early 2012. In February 2013, he published an e-book titled Porn Star: Everything You Want to Know and Are Embarrassed to Ask.

Advocacy
St. Croix has spoken out against Measure B, a law that requires the use of condoms in all vaginal and anal scenes filmed in Los Angeles County. He urged his fans to spread his NoToMeasureB public service announcements on social media on October 16, 2012. Later that month, he received the Positive Image Award from the Free Speech Coalition for his work to "dispel the myths and misconceptions of the adult entertainment industry." In April 2013, St. Croix appeared alongside former pornographic actor Danny Wylde on a HuffPost Live panel to debate Measure B.

Personal life
While away from the adult film industry, St. Croix lived in Cannes, France, and ran a small art gallery. He is an avid painter, primarily creating large-format acrylics. His work is heavily inspired by the expressionist movement. St. Croix describes his political views as "Libertarian with Republican business leanings."

Select performances

Awards

References

External links

 
 
 

1968 births
American male pornographic film actors
American pornographic film directors
Living people
People from Cannes
Pornographic film actors from Connecticut